Romania is a country located at the crossroads of Central, Eastern, and Southeastern Europe. It borders Bulgaria to the south, Ukraine to the north, Hungary to the west, Serbia to the southwest, Moldova to the east, and the Black Sea to the southeast. Romania is the twelfth-largest country in Europe and the sixth-most populous member state of the European Union. Its capital and largest city is Bucharest, followed by Iași, Cluj-Napoca, Timișoara, Constanța, Craiova, Brașov, and Galați.

Settlement in what is now Romania began in the Lower Paleolithic followed by written records attesting the kingdom of Dacia, its conquest, and subsequent Romanization by the Roman Empire during late antiquity. The modern Romanian state was formed in 1859 through a personal union of the Danubian Principalities of Moldavia and Wallachia. The new state, officially named Romania since 1866, gained independence from the Ottoman Empire in 1877. During World War I, after declaring its neutrality in 1914, Romania fought together with the Allied Powers from 1916. In the aftermath of the war, Bukovina, Bessarabia, Transylvania, and parts of Banat, Crișana, and Maramureș became part of the Kingdom of Romania. In June–August 1940, as a consequence of the Molotov–Ribbentrop Pact and Second Vienna Award, Romania was compelled to cede Bessarabia and Northern Bukovina to the Soviet Union and Northern Transylvania to Hungary. In November 1940, Romania signed the Tripartite Pact and, consequently, in June 1941 entered World War II on the Axis side, fighting against the Soviet Union until August 1944, when it joined the Allies and recovered Northern Transylvania. Following the war and occupation by the Red Army, Romania became a socialist republic and a member of the Warsaw Pact. After the 1989 Revolution, Romania began a transition towards democracy and a market economy.

Romania is a developing country with a high-income economy, ranking 53rd in the Human Development Index. It has the world's 47th largest economy by nominal GDP. Romania experienced rapid economic growth in the early 2000s; its economy is now based predominantly on services. It is a producer and net exporter of machines and electric energy through companies like Automobile Dacia and OMV Petrom. The majority of Romania's population are ethnic Romanians and religiously identify themselves as Eastern Orthodox Christians, speaking Romanian, a Romance language (more specifically Eastern Romance/Daco-Romance). The Romanian Orthodox Church is the largest religious denomination in the country. Romania is a member of the United Nations, the European Union, NATO, the Council of Europe, BSEC and WTO.

Etymology

"Romania" derives from the local name for Romanian, which in turn derives from Latin romanus, meaning "Roman" or "of Rome". This ethnonym for Romanians is first attested in the 16th century by Italian humanists travelling in Transylvania, Moldavia, and Wallachia.

After the abolition of serfdom in 1746, the word rumân gradually fell out of use and the spelling stabilised to the form . Tudor Vladimirescu, a revolutionary leader of the early 19th century, used the term  to refer exclusively to the principality of Wallachia.

The use of the name Romania to refer to the common homeland of all Romanians—its modern-day meaning—was first documented in the early 19th century.

In English, the name of the country was formerly spelt Rumania or Roumania. Romania became the predominant spelling around 1975. Romania is also the official English-language spelling used by the Romanian government. A handful of other languages (including Italian, Hungarian, Portuguese, and Norwegian) have also switched to "o" like English, but most languages continue to prefer forms with u, e.g. French , German and Swedish , Dutch  (oe pronounced as Spanish u), Spanish  (the archaic form  is still in use in Spain), Polish , Russian , and Japanese .

History

Prehistory

Human remains found in Peștera cu Oase ("Cave with Bones"), radiocarbon date from circa 40,000 years ago, and represent the oldest known Homo sapiens in Europe. Neolithic agriculture spread after the arrival of a mixed group of people from Thessaly in the 6th millennium BC. Excavations near a salt spring at Lunca yielded the earliest evidence for salt exploitation in Europe; here salt production began between the 5th and 4th millennium BC. The Cucuteni–Trypillia culture—the best known archaeological culture of Old Europe—flourished in Muntenia, southeastern Transylvania and northeastern Moldavia in the 3rd millennium BC.
The first fortified settlements appeared around 1800 BC, showing the militant character of Bronze Age societies.

Antiquity

Greek colonies established on the Black Sea coast in the 7th century BC became important centres of commerce with the local tribes. Among the native peoples, Herodotus listed the Getae of the Lower Danube region, the Agathyrsi of Transylvania and the Syginnae of the plains along the river Tisza at the beginning of the 5th century BC. Centuries later, Strabo associated the Getae with the Dacians who dominated the lands along the southern Carpathian Mountains in the 1st century BC. Burebista was the first Dacian ruler to unite the local tribes. He also conquered the Greek colonies in Dobruja and the neighbouring peoples as far as the Middle Danube and the Balkan Mountains between around 55 and 44 BC. After Burebista was murdered in 44 BC, his kingdom collapsed.

The Romans reached Dacia during Burebista's reign and conquered Dobruja in 46 AD. Dacia was again united under Decebalus around 85 AD. He resisted the Romans for decades, but the Roman army defeated his troops in 106 AD. Emperor Trajan transformed Banat, Oltenia and the greater part of Transylvania into a new province called Roman Dacia, but Dacian, Germanic and Sarmatian tribes continued to dominate the lands along the Roman frontiers. The Romans pursued an organised colonisation policy, and the provincials enjoyed a long period of peace and prosperity in the 2nd century. Scholars accepting the Daco-Roman continuity theory—one of the main theories about the origin of the Romanians—say that the cohabitation of the native Dacians and the Roman colonists in Roman Dacia was the first phase of the Romanians' ethnogenesis.

The Carpians, Goths and other neighbouring tribes made regular raids against Dacia from the 210s. The Romans could not resist, and Emperor Aurelian ordered the evacuation of the province Dacia Trajana in 271. Scholars supporting the continuity theory are convinced that most Latin-speaking commoners stayed behind when the army and civil administration was withdrawn. The Romans did not abandon their fortresses along the northern banks of the Lower Danube for decades, and Dobruja (known as Scythia Minor) remained an integral part of the Roman Empire until the early 7th century.

Middle Ages 

The Goths were expanding towards the Lower Danube from the 230s, forcing the native peoples to flee to the Roman Empire or to accept their suzerainty. The Goths' rule ended abruptly when the Huns invaded their territory in 376, causing new waves of migrations. The Huns forced the remnants of the local population into submission, but their empire collapsed in 454. The Gepids took possession of the former Dacia province. The nomadic Avars defeated the Gepids and established a powerful empire around 570. The Bulgars, who also came from the Eurasian steppes, occupied the Lower Danube region in 680.

Place names that are of Slavic origin abound in Romania, indicating that a significant Slavic-speaking population lived in the territory. The first Slavic groups settled in Moldavia and Wallachia in the 6th century, in Transylvania around 600. After the Avar Khaganate collapsed in the 790s, Bulgaria became the dominant power of the region, occupying lands as far as the river Tisa. The Council of Preslav declared Old Church Slavonic the language of liturgy in the First Bulgarian Tsardom in 893. The Romanians also adopted Old Church Slavonic as their liturgical language.

The Magyars (Hungarians) took control of the steppes north of the Lower Danube in the 830s, but the Bulgarians and the Pechenegs jointly forced them to abandon this region for the lowlands along the Middle Danube around 894. Centuries later, the Gesta Hungarorum wrote of the invading Magyars' wars against three dukes—Glad, Menumorut and the Vlach Gelou—for Banat, Crișana and Transylvania. The Gesta also listed many peoples—Slavs, Bulgarians, Vlachs, Khazars, and Székelys—inhabiting the same regions. The reliability of the Gesta is debated. Some scholars regard it as a basically accurate account, others describe it as a literary work filled with invented details. The Pechenegs seized the lowlands abandoned by the Hungarians to the east of the Carpathians.

Byzantine missionaries proselytised in the lands east of the Tisa from the 940s and Byzantine troops occupied Dobruja in the 970s. The first king of Hungary, Stephen I, who supported Western European missionaries, defeated the local chieftains and established Roman Catholic bishoprics (office of a bishop) in Transylvania and Banat in the early 11th century. Significant Pecheneg groups fled to the Byzantine Empire in the 1040s; the Oghuz Turks followed them, and the nomadic Cumans became the dominant power of the steppes in the 1060s. Cooperation between the Cumans and the Vlachs against the Byzantine Empire is well documented from the end of the 11th century. Scholars who reject the Daco-Roman continuity theory say that the first Vlach groups left their Balkan homeland for the mountain pastures of the eastern and southern Carpathians in the 11th century, establishing the Romanians' presence in the lands to the north of the Lower Danube.

Exposed to nomadic incursions, Transylvania developed into an important border province of the Kingdom of Hungary. The Székelys—a community of free warriors—settled in central Transylvania around 1100 and moved to the easternmost regions around 1200. Colonists from the Holy Roman Empire—the Transylvanian Saxons' ancestors—came to the province in the 1150s. A high-ranking royal official, styled voivode, ruled the Transylvanian counties from the 1170s, but the Székely and Saxon seats (or districts) were not subject to the voivodes' authority. Royal charters wrote of the "Vlachs' land" in southern Transylvania in the early 13th century, indicating the existence of autonomous Romanian communities. Papal correspondence mentions the activities of Orthodox prelates among the Romanians in Muntenia in the 1230s. Also in the 13th century, during one of its greatest periods of expansion, the Republic of Genoa started establishing many colonies and commercial and military ports on the Black Sea, in the current territory of Romania. The largest Genoese colonies in present-day Romania were Calafat (still known as such), Constanța (Costanza), Galați (Caladda), Giurgiu (San Giorgio), Licostomo and Vicina (unknown modern location). These would last until the 15th century.

The Mongols destroyed large territories during their invasion of Eastern and Central Europe in 1241 and 1242. The Mongols' Golden Horde emerged as the dominant power of Eastern Europe, but Béla IV of Hungary's land grant to the Knights Hospitallers in Oltenia and Muntenia shows that the local Vlach rulers were subject to the king's authority in 1247. Basarab I of Wallachia united the Romanian polities between the southern Carpathians and the Lower Danube in the 1310s. He defeated the Hungarian royal army in the Battle of Posada and secured the independence of Wallachia in 1330. The second Romanian principality, Moldavia, achieved full autonomy during the reign of Bogdan I around 1360. A local dynasty ruled the Despotate of Dobruja in the second half of the 14th century, but the Ottoman Empire took possession of the territory after 1388.

Princes Mircea I and Vlad III of Wallachia, and Stephen III of Moldavia defended their countries' independence against the Ottomans. Most Wallachian and Moldavian princes paid a regular tribute to the Ottoman sultans from 1417 and 1456, respectively. A military commander of Romanian origin, John Hunyadi, organised the defence of the Kingdom of Hungary until his death in 1456. Increasing taxes outraged the Transylvanian peasants, and they rose up in an open rebellion in 1437, but the Hungarian nobles and the heads of the Saxon and Székely communities jointly suppressed their revolt. The formal alliance of the Hungarian, Saxon, and Székely leaders, known as the Union of the Three Nations, became an important element of the self-government of Transylvania. The Orthodox Romanian knezes ("chiefs") were excluded from the Union.

Early Modern Times and national awakening 

The Kingdom of Hungary collapsed, and the Ottomans occupied parts of Banat and Crișana in 1541. Transylvania and Maramureș, along with the rest of Banat and Crișana developed into a new state under Ottoman suzerainty, the Principality of Transylvania. Reformation spread and four denominations—Calvinism, Lutheranism, Unitarianism, and Roman Catholicism—were officially acknowledged in 1568. The Romanians' Orthodox faith remained only tolerated, although they made up more than one-third of the population, according to 17th-century estimations.

The princes of Transylvania, Wallachia, and Moldavia joined the Holy League against the Ottoman Empire in 1594. The Wallachian prince, Michael the Brave, united the three principalities under his rule in May 1600. The neighboring powers forced him to abdicate in September, but he became a symbol of the unification of the Romanian lands in the 19th century. Although the rulers of the three principalities continued to pay tribute to the Ottomans, the most talented princes—Gabriel Bethlen of Transylvania, Matei Basarab of Wallachia, and Vasile Lupu of Moldavia—strengthened their autonomy.

The united armies of the Holy League expelled the Ottoman troops from Central Europe between 1684 and 1699, and the Principality of Transylvania was integrated into the Habsburg monarchy. The Habsburgs supported the Catholic clergy and persuaded the Orthodox Romanian prelates to accept the union with the Roman Catholic Church in 1699. The Church Union strengthened the Romanian intellectuals' devotion to their Roman heritage. The Orthodox Church was restored in Transylvania only after Orthodox monks stirred up revolts in 1744 and 1759. The organization of the Transylvanian Military Frontier caused further disturbances, especially among the Székelys in 1764.

Princes Dimitrie Cantemir of Moldavia and Constantin Brâncoveanu of Wallachia concluded alliances with the Habsburg Monarchy and Russia against the Ottomans, but they were dethroned in 1711 and 1714, respectively. The sultans lost confidence in the native princes and appointed Orthodox merchants from the Phanar district of Istanbul to rule Moldova and Wallachia. The Phanariot princes pursued oppressive fiscal policies and dissolved the army. The neighboring powers took advantage of the situation: the Habsburg Monarchy annexed the northwestern part of Moldavia, or Bukovina, in 1775, and the Russian Empire seized the eastern half of Moldavia, or Bessarabia, in 1812.

A census revealed that the Romanians were more numerous than any other ethnic group in Transylvania in 1733, but legislation continued to use contemptuous adjectives (such as "tolerated" and "admitted") when referring to them. The Uniate bishop, Inocențiu Micu-Klein who demanded recognition of the Romanians as the fourth privileged nation was forced into exile. Uniate and Orthodox clerics and laymen jointly signed a plea for the Transylvanian Romanians' emancipation in 1791, but the monarch and the local authorities refused to grant their requests.

Independence and monarchy 

The Treaty of Küçük Kaynarca authorised the Russian ambassador in Istanbul to defend the autonomy of Moldavia and Wallachia (known as the Danubian Principalities) in 1774. Taking advantage of the Greek War of Independence, a Wallachian lesser nobleman, Tudor Vladimirescu, stirred up a revolt against the Ottomans in January 1821, but he was murdered in June by Phanariot Greeks. After a new Russo-Turkish War, the Treaty of Adrianople strengthened the autonomy of the Danubian Principalities in 1829, although it also acknowledged the sultan's right to confirm the election of the princes.

Mihail Kogălniceanu, Nicolae Bălcescu and other leaders of the 1848 revolutions in Moldavia and Wallachia demanded the emancipation of the peasants and the union of the two principalities, but Russian and Ottoman troops crushed their revolt. The Wallachian revolutionists were the first to adopt the blue, yellow and red tricolour as the national flag. In Transylvania, most Romanians supported the imperial government against the Hungarian revolutionaries after the Diet passed a law concerning the union of Transylvania and Hungary. Bishop Andrei Șaguna proposed the unification of the Romanians of the Habsburg Monarchy in a separate duchy, but the central government refused to change the internal borders.

The Treaty of Paris put the Danubian Principalities under the collective guardianship of the Great Powers in 1856. After special assemblies convoked in Moldavia and Wallachia urged the unification of the two principalities, the Great Powers did not prevent the election of Alexandru Ioan Cuza as their collective domnitor (or ruling prince) in January 1859. The united principalities officially adopted the name Romania on 21 February 1862. Cuza's government carried out a series of reforms, including the secularisation of the property of monasteries and agrarian reform, but a coalition of conservative and radical politicians forced him to abdicate in February 1866.

Cuza's successor, a German prince, Karl of Hohenzollern-Sigmaringen (or Carol I), was elected in May. The parliament adopted the first constitution of Romania in the same year. The Great Powers acknowledged Romania's full independence at the Congress of Berlin and Carol I was crowned king in 1881. The Congress also granted the Danube Delta and Dobruja to Romania. Although Romanian scholars strove for the unification of all Romanians into a Greater Romania, the government did not openly support their irredentist projects.

The Transylvanian Romanians and Saxons wanted to maintain the separate status of Transylvania in the Habsburg Monarchy, but the Austro-Hungarian Compromise brought about the union of the province with Hungary in 1867. Ethnic Romanian politicians sharply opposed the Hungarian government's attempts to transform Hungary into a national state, especially the laws prescribing the obligatory teaching of Hungarian. Leaders of the Romanian National Party proposed the federalisation of Austria-Hungary and the Romanian intellectuals established a cultural association to promote the use of Romanian.

World Wars and Greater Romania

Fearing Russian expansionism, Romania secretly joined the Triple Alliance of Germany, Austria-Hungary, and Italy in 1883, but public opinion remained hostile to Austria-Hungary. Romania seized Southern Dobruja from Bulgaria in the Second Balkan War in 1913. German and Austrian-Hungarian diplomacy supported Bulgaria during the war, bringing about a rapprochement between Romania and the Triple Entente of France, Russia and the United Kingdom. The country remained neutral when World War I broke out in 1914, but Prime Minister Ion I. C. Brătianu started negotiations with the Entente Powers. After they promised Austrian-Hungarian territories with a majority of ethnic Romanian population to Romania in the Treaty of Bucharest, Romania entered the war against the Central Powers in 1916. The German and Austrian-Hungarian troops defeated the Romanian army and occupied three-quarters of the country by early 1917. After the October Revolution turned Russia from an ally into an enemy, Romania was forced to sign a harsh peace treaty with the Central Powers in May 1918, but the collapse of Russia also enabled the union of Bessarabia with Romania. King Ferdinand again mobilised the Romanian army on behalf of the Entente Powers a day before Germany capitulated on 11 November 1918.

Austria-Hungary quickly disintegrated after the war. The General Congress of Bukovina proclaimed the union of the province with Romania on 28 November 1918, and the Grand National Assembly proclaimed the union of Transylvania, Banat, Crișana and Maramureș with the kingdom on 1 December. Peace treaties with Austria, Bulgaria and Hungary delineated the new borders in 1919 and 1920, but the Soviet Union did not acknowledge the loss of Bessarabia. Romania achieved its greatest territorial extent, expanding from the pre-war . A new electoral system granted voting rights to all adult male citizens, and a series of radical agrarian reforms transformed the country into a "nation of small landowners" between 1918 and 1921. Gender equality as a principle was enacted, but women could not vote or be candidates. Calypso Botez established the National Council of Romanian Women to promote feminist ideas. Romania was a multiethnic country, with ethnic minorities making up about 30% of the population, but the new constitution declared it a unitary national state in 1923. Although minorities could establish their own schools, Romanian language, history and geography could only be taught in Romanian.

Agriculture remained the principal sector of economy, but several branches of industry—especially the production of coal, oil, metals, synthetic rubber, explosives and cosmetics—developed during the interwar period. With oil production of 5.8 million tons in 1930, Romania ranked sixth in the world. Two parties, the National Liberal Party and the National Peasants' Party, dominated political life, but the Great Depression in Romania brought about significant changes in the 1930s. The democratic parties were squeezed between conflicts with the fascist and anti-Semitic Iron Guard and the authoritarian tendencies of King Carol II. The King promulgated a new constitution and dissolved the political parties in 1938, replacing the parliamentary system with a royal dictatorship.

The 1938 Munich Agreement convinced King Carol II that France and the United Kingdom could not defend Romanian interests. German preparations for a new war required the regular supply of Romanian oil and agricultural products. The two countries concluded a treaty concerning the coordination of their economic policies in 1939, but the King could not persuade Adolf Hitler to guarantee Romania's frontiers. Romania was forced to cede Bessarabia and Northern Bukovina to the Soviet Union on 26 June 1940, Northern Transylvania to Hungary on 30 August, and Southern Dobruja to Bulgaria in September. After the territorial losses, the King was forced to abdicate in favour of his minor son, Michael I, on 6 September, and Romania was transformed into a national-legionary state under the leadership of General Ion Antonescu. Antonescu signed the Tripartite Pact of Germany, Italy and Japan on 23 November. The Iron Guard staged a coup against Antonescu, but he crushed the riot with German support and introduced a military dictatorship in early 1941.

Romania entered World War II soon after the German invasion of the Soviet Union in June 1941. The country regained Bessarabia and Northern Bukovina, and the Germans placed Transnistria (the territory between the rivers Dniester and Dnieper) under Romanian administration. Romanian and German troops massacred at least 160,000 local Jews in these territories; more than 105,000 Jews and about 11,000 Gypsies died during their deportation from Bessarabia to Transnistria. Most of the Jewish population of Moldavia, Wallachia, Banat and Southern Transylvania survived, but their fundamental rights were limited. After the German occupation of Hungary in March 1944, about 132,000 Jews – mainly Hungarian-speaking – were deported to extermination camps from Northern Transylvania with the Hungarian authorities' support.

After the Soviet victory in the Battle of Stalingrad in 1943, Iuliu Maniu, a leader of the opposition to Antonescu, entered into secret negotiations with British diplomats who made it clear that Romania had to seek reconciliation with the Soviet Union. To facilitate the coordination of their activities against Antonescu's regime, the National Liberal and National Peasants' parties established the National Democratic Bloc, which also included the Social Democratic and Communist parties. After a successful Soviet offensive, the young King Michael I ordered Antonescu's arrest and appointed politicians from the National Democratic Bloc to form a new government on 23 August 1944. Romania switched sides during the war, and nearly 250,000 Romanian troops joined the Red Army's military campaign against Hungary and Germany, but Joseph Stalin regarded the country as an occupied territory within the Soviet sphere of influence. Stalin's deputy instructed the King to make the Communists' candidate, Petru Groza, the prime minister in March 1945. The Romanian administration in Northern Transylvania was soon restored, and Groza's government carried out an agrarian reform. In February 1947, the Paris Peace Treaties confirmed the return of Northern Transylvania to Romania, but they also legalised the presence of units of the Red Army in the country.

Communism 

During the Soviet occupation of Romania, the communist-dominated government called for new elections in 1946, which they fraudulently won, with a fabricated 70% majority of the vote. Thus, they rapidly established themselves as the dominant political force. Gheorghe Gheorghiu-Dej, a communist party leader imprisoned in 1933, escaped in 1944 to become Romania's first communist leader. In February 1947, he and others forced King Michael I to abdicate and leave the country and proclaimed Romania a people's republic. Romania remained under the direct military occupation and economic control of the USSR until the late 1950s. During this period, Romania's vast natural resources were drained continuously by mixed Soviet-Romanian companies (SovRoms) set up for unilateral exploitative purposes.

In 1948, the state began to nationalise private firms and to collectivise agriculture. Until the early 1960s, the government severely curtailed political liberties and vigorously suppressed any dissent with the help of the Securitate—the Romanian secret police. During this period the regime launched several campaigns of purges during which numerous "enemies of the state" and "parasite elements" were targeted for different forms of punishment including: deportation, internal exile, internment in forced labour camps and prisons—sometimes for life—as well as extrajudicial killing. Nevertheless, anti-communist resistance was one of the most long-lasting and strongest in the Eastern Bloc. A 2006 commission estimated the number of direct victims of the Communist repression at two million people.

In 1965, Nicolae Ceaușescu came to power and started to conduct the country's foreign policy more independently from the Soviet Union. Thus, communist Romania was the only Warsaw Pact country which refused to participate in the Soviet-led 1968 invasion of Czechoslovakia. Ceaușescu even publicly condemned the action as "a big mistake, [and] a serious danger to peace in Europe and to the fate of Communism in the world". It was the only Communist state to maintain diplomatic relations with Israel after 1967's Six-Day War and established diplomatic relations with West Germany the same year. At the same time, close ties with the Arab countries and the Palestine Liberation Organization (PLO) allowed Romania to play a key role in the Israel–Egypt and Israel–PLO peace talks.

As Romania's foreign debt increased sharply between 1977 and 1981 (from US$3 billion to $10 billion), the influence of international financial organisations—such as the International Monetary Fund (IMF) and the World Bank—grew, gradually conflicting with Ceaușescu's autocratic rule. He eventually initiated a policy of total reimbursement of the foreign debt by imposing austerity steps that impoverished the population and exhausted the economy. The process succeeded in repaying all of Romania's foreign government debt in 1989. At the same time, Ceaușescu greatly extended the authority of the Securitate secret police and imposed a severe cult of personality, which led to a dramatic decrease in the dictator's popularity and culminated in his overthrow in the violent Romanian Revolution of December 1989 in which thousands were killed or injured.

After a trial, Ceaușescu and his wife were executed by firing squad at a military base outside Bucharest on December 25, 1989. The charges for which they were executed were, among others, genocide by starvation.

Contemporary period 

After the 1989 revolution, the National Salvation Front (FSN), led by Ion Iliescu, took partial and superficial multi-party democratic and free market measures after seizing power as an ad interim governing body. In April 1990, a sit-in protest contesting the results of that year's legislative elections and accusing the FSN, including Iliescu, of being made up of former Communists and members of the Securitate grew rapidly to become what was called the Golaniad. Peaceful demonstrations degenerated into violence, prompting the intervention of coal miners summoned by Iliescu. This episode has been documented widely by both local and foreign media, and is remembered as the June 1990 Mineriad.

The subsequent disintegration of the Front produced several political parties, including most notably the Social Democratic Party (PDSR then PSD) and the Democratic Party (PD and subsequently PDL). The former governed Romania from 1990 until 1996 through several coalitions and governments, with Ion Iliescu as head of state. Since then, there have been several other democratic changes of government: in 1996 Emil Constantinescu was elected president, in 2000 Iliescu returned to power, while Traian Băsescu was elected in 2004 and narrowly re-elected in 2009.

In 2009, the country was bailed out by the International Monetary Fund as an aftershock of the Great Recession in Europe. In November 2014, Sibiu former FDGR/DFDR mayor Klaus Iohannis was elected president, unexpectedly defeating former Prime Minister Victor Ponta, who had been previously leading in the opinion polls. This surprise victory was attributed by many analysts to the implication of the Romanian diaspora in the voting process, with almost 50% casting their votes for Klaus Iohannis in the first round, compared to only 16% for Ponta. In 2019, Iohannis was re-elected president in a landslide victory over former Prime Minister Viorica Dăncilă.

The post–1989 period is characterised by the fact that most of the former industrial and economic enterprises which were built and operated during the communist period were closed, mainly as a result of the policies of privatisation of the post–1989 regimes.

Corruption has been a major issue in contemporary Romanian politics. In November 2015, massive anti-corruption protests which developed in the wake of the Colectiv nightclub fire led to the resignation of Romania's Prime Minister Victor Ponta. During 2017–2018, in response to measures which were perceived to weaken the fight against corruption, some of the biggest protests since 1989 took place in Romania, with over 500,000 people protesting across the country.

Nevertheless, there have been efforts to tackle corruption. A National Anticorruption Directorate was formed in the country in 2002. Relatively recently, in Transparency International's 2019 Corruption Perceptions Index, Romania's public sector corruption score deteriorated to 44 out of 100, reversing gains made in previous years.

NATO and EU integration 

After the end of the Cold War, Romania developed closer ties with Western Europe and the United States, eventually joining NATO in 2004, and hosting the 2008 summit in Bucharest. The country applied in June 1993 for membership in the European Union and became an Associated State of the EU in 1995, an Acceding Country in 2004, and a full member on 1 January 2007. 

During the 2000s, Romania had one of the highest economic growth rates in Europe and has been referred at times as "the Tiger of Eastern Europe". This has been accompanied by a significant improvement in living standards as the country successfully reduced domestic poverty and established a functional democratic state. However, Romania's development suffered a major setback during the late 2000s' recession leading to a large gross domestic product contraction and a budget deficit in 2009. This led to Romania borrowing from the International Monetary Fund. Worsening economic conditions led to unrest and triggered a political crisis in 2012.

Romania still faces problems related to infrastructure, medical services, education, and corruption. Near the end of 2013, The Economist reported Romania again enjoying "booming" economic growth at 4.1% that year, with wages rising fast and a lower unemployment than in Britain. Economic growth accelerated in the midst of government liberalisations in opening up new sectors to competition and investment—most notably, energy and telecoms. In 2016, the Human Development Index ranked Romania as a nation of "Very High Human Development".

Following the experience of economic instability throughout the 1990s, and the implementation of a free travel agreement with the EU, a great number of Romanians emigrated to Western Europe and North America, with particularly large communities in Italy, Germany, and Spain. In 2016, the Romanian diaspora was estimated to be over 3.6 million people, the fifth-highest emigrant population in the world.

Geography and climate

It lies between latitudes 43° and 49° N and longitudes 20° and 30° E. The terrain is distributed roughly equally between mountains, hills, and plains. They are surrounded by the Moldavian and Transylvanian plateaus, the Carpathian Basin and the Wallachian plains.

Romania is home to six terrestrial ecoregions: Balkan mixed forests, Central European mixed forests, East European forest steppe, Pannonian mixed forests, Carpathian montane conifer forests, and Pontic steppe. Natural and semi-natural ecosystems cover about 47% of the country's land area. There are almost  (about 5% of the total area) of protected areas in Romania covering 13 national parks and three biosphere reserves. The Danube river forms a large part of the border with Serbia and Bulgaria, and flows into the Black Sea, forming the Danube Delta, which is the second-largest and best-preserved delta in Europe, and a biosphere reserve and a biodiversity World Heritage Site. At , the Danube Delta is the largest continuous marshland in Europe, and supports 1,688 different plant species alone.

Romania has one of the largest areas of undisturbed forest in Europe, covering almost 27% of its territory. The country had a 2019 Forest Landscape Integrity Index mean score of 5.95/10, ranking it 90th globally out of 172 countries. Some 3,700 plant species have been identified in the country, from which to date 23 have been declared natural monuments, 74 extinct, 39 endangered, 171 vulnerable, and 1,253 rare.

The fauna of Romania consists of 33,792 species of animals, 33,085 invertebrate and 707 vertebrate, with almost 400 unique species of mammals, birds, reptiles, and amphibians, including about 50% of Europe's (excluding Russia) brown bears and 20% of its wolves.

Climate

Owing to its distance from open sea and its position on the southeastern portion of the European continent, Romania has a climate that is temperate and continental, with four distinct seasons. The average annual temperature is  in the south and  in the north. In winter, the average maximum temperature is below .
There are some regional differences: in western sections, such as Banat, the climate is milder and has some Mediterranean influences; the eastern part of the country has a more pronounced continental climate. In Dobruja, the Black Sea also exerts an influence over the region's climate.

Governance

The Constitution of Romania is based on the constitution of France's Fifth Republic and was approved in a national referendum on 8 December 1991 and amended in October 2003 to bring it into conformity with EU legislation. The country is governed on the basis of a multi-party democratic system and the separation of powers between the legislative, executive and judicial branches. It is a semi-presidential republic where executive functions are held by both the government and the president. The latter is elected by popular vote for a maximum of two terms of five years and appoints the prime minister who in turn appoints the Council of Ministers. The legislative branch of the government, collectively known as the Parliament (residing at the Palace of the Parliament), consists of two chambers (Senate and Chamber of Deputies) whose members are elected every four years by simple plurality.

The justice system is independent of the other branches of government and is made up of a hierarchical system of courts with the High Court of Cassation and Justice being the supreme court of Romania. There are also courts of appeal, county courts and local courts. The Romanian judicial system is strongly influenced by the French model, is based on civil law and is inquisitorial in nature. The Constitutional Court (Curtea Constituțională) is responsible for judging the compliance of laws and other state regulations with the constitution, which is the fundamental law of the country and can only be amended through a public referendum. Romania's 2007 entry into the EU has been a significant influence on its domestic policy, and including judicial reforms, increased judicial cooperation with other member states, and measures to combat corruption.

Foreign relations

Since December 1989, Romania has pursued a policy of strengthening relations with the West in general, more specifically with the United States and the European Union, albeit with limited relations involving the Russian Federation. It joined the NATO on 29 March 2004, the European Union (EU) on 1 January 2007, while it joined the International Monetary Fund and the World Bank in 1972, and is a founding member of the World Trade Organization.

In the past, recent governments have stated that one of their goals is to strengthen ties with and helping other countries (in particular Moldova, Ukraine, and Georgia) with the process of integration with the rest of the West. Romania has also made clear since the late 1990s that it supports NATO and EU membership for the democratic former Soviet republics in Eastern Europe and the Caucasus. Romania also declared its public support for Turkey, and Croatia joining the European Union.

Romania opted on 1 January 2007, to accede to the Schengen Area, and its bid to join was approved by the European Parliament in June 2011, but was rejected by the EU Council in September 2011. As of August 2019, its acceptance into the Schengen Area is hampered because the European Council has misgivings about Romania's adherence to the rule of law, a fundamental principle of EU membership.

In December 2005, President Traian Băsescu and United States Secretary of State Condoleezza Rice signed an agreement that would allow a U.S. military presence at several Romanian facilities primarily in the eastern part of the country. In May 2009, Hillary Clinton, US Secretary of State, declared that "Romania is one of the most trustworthy and respectable partners of the USA."

Relations with Moldova are a special case given that the two countries share the same language and a common history. A movement for unification of Romania and Moldova appeared in the early 1990s after both countries achieved emancipation from communist rule but lost ground in the mid-1990s when a new Moldovan government pursued an agenda towards preserving a Moldovan republic independent of Romania. After the 2009 protests in Moldova and the subsequent removal of Communists from power, relations between the two countries have improved considerably.

Military

The Romanian Armed Forces consist of land, air, and naval forces led by a Commander-in-chief under the supervision of the Ministry of National Defence, and by the president as the Supreme Commander during wartime. The Armed Forces consist of approximately 15,000 civilians and 75,000 military personnel—45,800 for land, 13,250 for air, 6,800 for naval forces, and 8,800 in other fields. Total defence spending in 2007 accounted for 2.05% of total national GDP, or approximately US$2.9 billion, with a total of $11 billion spent between 2006 and 2011 for modernization and acquisition of new equipment.

The Air Force operates modernised Soviet MiG-21 Lancer fighters. The Air Force purchased seven new C-27J Spartan tactical airlifters, while the Naval Forces acquired two modernised Type 22 frigates from the British Royal Navy.

Romania contributed troops to the international coalition in Afghanistan beginning in 2002, with a peak deployment of 1,600 troops in 2010 (which was the 4th largest contribution according to the US). Its combat mission in the country concluded in 2014. Romanian troops participated in the occupation of Iraq, reaching a peak of 730 soldiers before being slowly drawn down to 350 soldiers. Romania terminated its mission in Iraq and withdrew its last troops on 24 July 2009, among the last countries to do so. The frigate the Regele Ferdinand participated in the 2011 military intervention in Libya.

In December 2011, the Romanian Senate unanimously adopted the draft law ratifying the Romania-United States agreement signed in September of the same year that would allow the establishment and operation of a US land-based ballistic missile defence system in Romania as part of NATO's efforts to build a continental missile shield.

Administrative divisions

Romania is divided into 41 counties (județe, pronounced judetse) and the municipality of Bucharest. Each county is administered by a county council, responsible for local affairs, as well as a prefect responsible for the administration of national affairs at the county level. The prefect is appointed by the central government but cannot be a member of any political party. Each county is subdivided further into cities and communes, which have their own mayor and local council. There are a total of 320 cities and 2,861 communes in Romania. A total of 103 of the larger cities have municipality status, which gives them greater administrative power over local affairs. The municipality of Bucharest is a special case, as it enjoys a status on par to that of a county. It is further divided into six sectors and has a prefect, a general mayor (primar), and a general city council.

The NUTS-3 (Nomenclature of Territorial Units for Statistics) level divisions of the European Union reflect Romania's administrative-territorial structure and correspond to the 41 counties plus Bucharest. The cities and communes correspond to the NUTS-5 level divisions, but there are no current NUTS-4 level divisions. The NUTS-1 (four macroregions) and NUTS-2 (eight development regions) divisions exist but have no administrative capacity and are used instead for coordinating regional development projects and statistical purposes.

Economy

In 2019, Romania has a GDP (PPP) of around $547 billion and a GDP per capita (PPP) of $28,189. According to the World Bank, Romania is a high-income economy. According to Eurostat, Romania's GDP per capita (PPS) was 70% of the EU average (100%) in 2019, an increase from 44% in 2007 (the year of Romania's accession to the EU), making Romania one of the fastest growing economies in the EU.

After 1989 the country experienced a decade of economic instability and decline, led in part by an obsolete industrial base and a lack of structural reform. From 2000 onward, however, the Romanian economy was transformed into one of relative macroeconomic stability, characterised by high growth, low unemployment and declining inflation. In 2006, according to the Romanian Statistics Office, GDP growth in real terms was recorded at 7.7%, one of the highest rates in Europe. However, the Great Recession forced the government to borrow externally, including an IMF €20 billion bailout program. According to The World Bank, GDP per capita in purchasing power parity grew from $13,687 in 2007 to $28,206 in 2018. Romania's net average monthly wage increased to 666 euro as of 2020, and an inflation rate of −1.1% in 2016. Unemployment in Romania was at 4.3% in August 2018, which is low compared to other EU countries.

Industrial output growth reached 6.5% year-on-year in February 2013, the highest in the Europe. The largest local companies include car maker Automobile Dacia, Petrom, Rompetrol, Ford Romania, Electrica, Romgaz, RCS & RDS and Banca Transilvania. As of 2020, there are around 6000 exports per month. Romania's main exports are: cars, software, clothing and textiles, industrial machinery, electrical and electronic equipment, metallurgic products, raw materials, military equipment, pharmaceuticals, fine chemicals, and agricultural products (fruits, vegetables, and flowers). Trade is mostly centred on the member states of the European Union, with Germany and Italy being the country's single largest trading partners. The account balance in 2012 was estimated to be 4.52% of GDP.

After a series of privatizations and reforms in the late 1990s and 2000s, government intervention in the Romanian economy is somewhat less than in other European economies. In 2005, the government replaced Romania's progressive tax system with a flat tax of 16% for both personal income and corporate profit, among the lowest rates in the European Union. The economy is based predominantly on services, which account for 56.2% of the country's total GDP as of 2017, with industry and agriculture accounting for 30% and 4.4% respectively.
Approximately 25.8% of the Romanian workforce is employed in agriculture, one of the highest rates in Europe.

Romania has attracted increasing amounts of foreign investment following the end of Communism, with the stock of foreign direct investment (FDI) in Romania rising to €83.8 billion in June 2019. Romania's FDI outward stock (an external or foreign business either investing in or purchasing the stock of a local economy) amounted to $745 million in December 2018, the lowest value among the 28 EU member states. Some companies that have invested in Romania include Coca-Cola, McDonald's, Pizza Hut, Procter & Gamble, Citibank, and IBM.

According to a 2019 World Bank report, Romania ranks 52nd out of 190 economies in the ease of doing business, one place higher than neighbouring Hungary and one place lower than Italy. The report praised the consistent enforcement of contracts and access to credit in the country, while noting difficulties in access to electricity and dealing with construction permits.

Since 1867 the official currency has been the Romanian leu ("lion") and following a denomination in 2005. After joining the EU in 2007, Romania is expected to adopt the Euro in 2024.

In January 2020, Romania's external debt was reported to be US$122 billion according to CEIC data.

Infrastructure

Romania's rail transport experienced a dramatic decline after 1989 and was estimated at 99 million passenger journeys in 2004, but has experienced a recent (2013) revival due to infrastructure improvements and partial privatisation of lines, accounting for 45% of all passenger and freight movements in the country. Bucharest Metro, the only underground railway system, was opened in 1979 and measures  with an average ridership in 2007 of 600,000 passengers during the workweek in the country. There are sixteen international commercial airports in service today. Over 12.8 million passengers flew through Bucharest's Henri Coandă International Airport in 2017.

Romania is a net exporter of electrical energy and is 52nd worldwide in terms of consumption of electric energy. Around a third of the produced energy comes from renewable sources, mostly as hydroelectric power. In 2015, the main sources were coal (28%), hydroelectric (30%), nuclear (18%), and hydrocarbons (14%). It has one of the largest refining capacities in Eastern Europe, even though oil and natural gas production has been decreasing for more than a decade. With one of the largest reserves of crude oil and shale gas in Europe it is among the most energy-independent countries in the European Union, and is looking to expand its nuclear power plant at Cernavodă further.

There were almost 18.3 million connections to the Internet in June 2014. According to Bloomberg, in 2013 Romania ranked fifth in the world, and according to The Independent, it ranks number one in Europe at Internet speeds, with Timișoara ranked among the highest in the world.

Tourism 

Tourism is a significant contributor to the Romanian economy, generating around 5% of GDP. The number of tourists has been rising steadily, reaching 9.33 million foreign tourists in 2016, according to the Worldbank. Tourism in Romania attracted €400 million in investments in 2005. More than 60% of the foreign visitors in 2007 were from other EU countries. The popular summer attractions of Mamaia and other Black Sea Resorts attracted 1.3 million tourists in 2009.

Most popular skiing resorts are along the Valea Prahovei and in Poiana Brașov. Castles, fortifications, or strongholds as well as preserved medieval Transylvanian cities or towns such as Cluj-Napoca, Sibiu, Brașov, Alba Iulia, Baia Mare, Bistrița, Mediaș, Cisnădie, Sebeș, or Sighișoara also attract a large number of tourists. Bran Castle, near Brașov, is one of the most famous attractions in Romania, drawing hundreds of thousands of tourists every year as it is often advertised as being Dracula's Castle.

Rural tourism, focusing on folklore and traditions, has become an important alternative, and is targeted to promote such sites as Bran and its Dracula's Castle, the painted churches of northern Moldavia, and the wooden churches of Maramureș, or the villages with fortified churches in Transylvania. Other attractions include the Danube Delta or the Sculptural Ensemble of Constantin Brâncuși at Târgu Jiu.

In 2014, Romania had 32,500 companies active in the hotel and restaurant industry, with a total turnover of €2.6 billion. More than 1.9 million foreign tourists visited Romania in 2014, 12% more than in 2013. According to the country's National Statistics Institute, some 77% came from Europe (particularly from Germany, Italy, and France), 12% from Asia, and less than 7% from North America.

Science and technology

Historically, Romanian researchers and inventors have made notable contributions to several fields. In the history of flight, Traian Vuia built the first airplane to take off under its own power and Aurel Vlaicu built and flew some of the earliest successful aircraft, while Henri Coandă discovered the Coandă effect of fluidics. Victor Babeș discovered more than 50 types of bacteria; biologist Nicolae Paulescu developed an extract of the pancreas and showed that it lowers blood sugar in diabetic dogs, thus being significant in the history of insulin; while Emil Palade received the Nobel Prize for his contributions to cell biology. Lazăr Edeleanu was the first chemist to synthesise amphetamine, and he also invented the procedure of separating valuable petroleum components with selective solvents.

During the 1990s and 2000s, the development of research was hampered by several factors, including: corruption, low funding, and a considerable brain drain. In recent years, Romania has ranked the lowest or second-lowest in the European Union by research and development spending as a percentage of GDP, standing at roughly 0.5% in 2016 and 2017, substantially below the EU average of just over 2%. The country joined the European Space Agency (ESA) in 2011, and CERN in 2016. In 2018, however, Romania lost its voting rights in the ESA due to a failure to pay €56.8 million in membership contributions to the agency.

In the early 2010s, the situation for science in Romania was characterised as "rapidly improving" albeit from a low base. In January 2011, Parliament passed a law that enforces "strict quality control on universities and introduces tough rules for funding evaluation and peer review". Romania was ranked 48th in the Global Innovation Index in 2021, up from 50th in 2019.

The nuclear physics facility of the European Union's proposed Extreme Light Infrastructure (ELI) laser will be built in Romania. In early 2012, Romania launched its first satellite from the Centre Spatial Guyanais in French Guiana. Starting in December 2014, Romania became a co-owner of the International Space Station.

Demographics

According to the 2022 Romanian census, Romania's population was 19,053,815. Like other countries in the region, its population is expected to decline gradually as a result of sub-replacement fertility rates and negative net migration rate. According to the 2022 Romanian census, Romanians made up 89.33% of the population, and the largest ethnic minorities are the Hungarians 6.05% of the population, and the Roma 3.44% of the population. Hungarians constitute a majority in the counties of Harghita and Covasna. Other minorities include Ukrainians, Germans, Turks, Lipovans, Aromanians, Tatars, and Serbs. In 1930, there were 745,421 Germans living in Romania, but only about 36,000 remained in the country to this day. , there were also approximately 133,000 immigrants living in Romania, primarily from Moldova and China.

The total fertility rate (TFR) in 2018 was estimated at 1.36 children born per woman, which is below the replacement rate of 2.1, and one of the lowest in the world, it remains considerably below the high of 5.82 children born per woman in 1912. In 2014, 31.2% of births were to unmarried women.
The birth rate (9.49‰, 2012) is much lower than the mortality rate (11.84‰, 2012), resulting in a shrinking (−0.26% per year, 2012) and aging population (median age: 41.6 years, 2018), one of the oldest populations in the world, with approximately 16.8% of total population aged 65 years and over. The life expectancy in 2015 was estimated at 74.92 years (71.46 years male, 78.59 years female).
The number of Romanians and individuals with ancestors born in Romania living abroad is estimated at 12 million. After the Romanian Revolution of 1989, a significant number of Romanians emigrated to other European countries, North America or Australia. For example, in 1990, 96,919 Romanians permanently settled abroad.

Languages 

The official language is Romanian, a Romance language (the most widely spoken of the Eastern Romance branch), which presents a consistent degree of similarity to Aromanian, Megleno-Romanian, and Istro-Romanian, but shares many features equally with the rest of the Western Romance languages, specifically Italian, French, Spanish, Portuguese, and Catalan. The Romanian alphabet contains the same 26 letters of the standard Latin alphabet, as well as five additional ones (namely ă, â, î , ț , and ș), totaling 31.

Romanian is spoken as a first language by 91.55% of the entire population, while Hungarian and Vlax Romani are spoken by 6.28% and 1.20% of the population, respectively. There are also 40,861 native speakers of Ukrainian (concentrated in some compact regions near the border, where they form local majorities), 17,101 native speakers of Turkish, 15,943 native speakers of German, and 14,414 native speakers of Russian living in Romania.

According to the Constitution, local councils ensure linguistic rights to all minorities. In localities with ethnic minorities of over 20%, that minority's language can be used in the public administration, justice system, and education. Foreign citizens and stateless persons who live in Romania have access to justice and education in their own language. English and French are the main foreign languages taught in schools. In 2010, the Organisation internationale de la Francophonie identified 4,756,100 French speakers in the country. According to the 2012 Eurobarometer, English is spoken by 31% of Romanians, French is spoken by 17%, and Italian and German, each by 7%.

Religion

Romania is a secular state and has no state religion. An overwhelming majority of the population identify themselves as Christians. At the country's 2022 census, 73.86% of respondents identified as Orthodox Christians, with 73.42% belonging to the Romanian Orthodox Church. Other denominations include Protestantism (6.22%), Roman Catholicism (3.89%), and Greek Catholicism (0.61%). From the remaining population 128,291 people belong to other Christian denominations or have another religion, which includes 58,335 Muslims (mostly of Turkish and Tatar ethnicity) and 2,707 Jewish (Jews once constituted 4% of the Romanian population—728,115 persons in the 1930 census). Additionally, 71,417 people are irreligious, 57,205 are atheist, 25,485 are agnostic, and 2,895,539 people chose to not declare their religion.

The Romanian Orthodox Church is an autocephalous Eastern Orthodox Church in full communion with other Orthodox churches, with a Patriarch as its leader. It is the third-largest Eastern Orthodox Church in the world, and unlike other Orthodox churches, it functions within a Latin culture and uses a Romance liturgical language. Its canonical jurisdiction covers the territories of Romania and Moldova. Romania has the world's third-largest Eastern Orthodox population.

Urbanisation

Although 54.0% of the population lived in urban areas in 2011, this percentage has been declining since 1996. Counties with over   urban population are Hunedoara, Brașov and Constanța, while those with less than a third are Dâmbovița (30.06%) and Giurgiu and Teleorman. Bucharest is the capital and the largest city in Romania, with a population of over 1.8 million in 2011. Its larger urban zone has a population of almost 2.2 million, which are planned to be included into a metropolitan area up to 20 times the area of the city proper. Another 19 cities have a population of over 100,000, with Cluj-Napoca and Timișoara of slightly more than 300,000 inhabitants, Iași, Constanța, Craiova, and Brașov with over 250,000 inhabitants, and Galați and Ploiești with over 200,000 inhabitants. Metropolitan areas have been constituted for most of these cities.

Education 

Since the Romanian Revolution of 1989, the Romanian educational system has been in a continuous process of reform that has received mixed criticism. In 2004, some 4.4 million individuals were enrolled in school. Of these, 650,000 were in kindergarten (three-six years), 3.11 million in primary and secondary level, and 650,000 in tertiary level (universities). In 2018, the adult literacy rate was 98.8%. Kindergarten is optional between three and five years. Since 2020, compulsory schooling starts at age 5 with the last year of kindergarten (grupa mare) and is compulsory until twelfth grade. Primary and secondary education is divided into 12 or 13 grades. There is also a semi-legal, informal private tutoring system used mostly during secondary school, which prospered during the Communist regime.

Alexandru Ioan Cuza University of Iași, Babeș-Bolyai University of Cluj-Napoca, University of Bucharest, and West University of Timișoara have been included in the QS World University Rankings' top 800.

Romania ranks fifth in the all-time medal count at the International Mathematical Olympiad with 316 total medals, dating back to 1959. Ciprian Manolescu managed to write a perfect paper (42 points) for a gold medal more times than anybody else in the history of the competition, in 1995, 1996 and 1997. Romania has achieved the highest team score in the competition, after China, Russia, the United States and Hungary. Romania also ranks sixth in the all-time medal count at the International Olympiad in Informatics with 107 total medals, dating back to 1989.

Healthcare

Romania has a universal health care system; total health expenditures by the government are roughly 5% of GDP. It covers medical examinations, any surgical operations, and any post-operative medical care, and provides free or subsidised medicine for a range of diseases. The state is obliged to fund public hospitals and clinics. The most common causes of death are cardiovascular diseases and cancer. Transmissible diseases are quite common by European standards. In 2010, Romania had 428 state and 25 private hospitals, with 6.2 hospital beds per 1,000 people, and over 200,000 medical staff, including over 52,000 doctors. , the emigration rate of doctors was 9%, higher than the European average of 2.5%.

Culture

Arts and monuments 

The topic of the origin of Romanian culture began to be discussed by the end of the 18th century among the Transylvanian School scholars. Several writers rose to prominence in the 19th century, including: George Coșbuc, Ioan Slavici, Mihail Kogălniceanu, Vasile Alecsandri, Nicolae Bălcescu, Ion Luca Caragiale, Ion Creangă, and Mihai Eminescu, the later being considered the greatest and most influential Romanian poet, particularly for the poem Luceafărul.

In the 20th century, a number of Romanian artists and writers achieved international acclaim, including: Tristan Tzara, Marcel Janco, Mircea Eliade, Nicolae Grigorescu, Marin Preda, Liviu Rebreanu, Eugène Ionesco, Emil Cioran, and Constantin Brâncuși. Brâncuși has a sculptural ensemble in Târgu Jiu, while his sculpture Bird in Space, was auctioned in 2005 for $27.5 million. Romanian-born Holocaust survivor Elie Wiesel received the Nobel Peace Prize in 1986, while Banat Swabian writer Herta Müller received the 2009 Nobel Prize in Literature.

Prominent Romanian painters include: Nicolae Grigorescu, Ștefan Luchian, Ion Andreescu Nicolae Tonitza, and Theodor Aman. Notable Romanian classical composers of the 19th and 20th centuries include: Ciprian Porumbescu, Anton Pann, Eduard Caudella, Mihail Jora, Dinu Lipatti, and especially George Enescu. The annual George Enescu Festival is held in Bucharest in honour of the 20th-century composer.

Contemporary musicians like Angela Gheorghiu, Gheorghe Zamfir, Inna, Alexandra Stan, and many others have achieved various levels of international acclaim. At the Eurovision Song Contest Romanian singers achieved third place in 2005 and 2010.

In cinema, several movies of the Romanian New Wave have achieved international acclaim. At the Cannes Film Festival, The Death of Mr. Lazarescu by Cristi Puiu won the Prix Un Certain Regard in 2005, while 4 Months, 3 Weeks and 2 Days by Cristian Mungiu won the festival's top prize, the Palme d'Or, in 2007. At the Berlin International Film Festival, Child's Pose by Călin Peter Netzer won the Golden Bear in 2013.

The list of World Heritage Sites includes six cultural sites located within Romania, including eight painted churches of northern Moldavia, eight wooden churches of Maramureș, seven villages with fortified churches in Transylvania, the Horezu Monastery, and the Historic Centre of Sighișoara. The city of Sibiu, with its Brukenthal National Museum, was selected as the 2007 European Capital of Culture and the 2019 European Region of Gastronomy. Multiple castles exist in Romania, including the popular tourist attractions of Peleș Castle, Corvin Castle, and Bran Castle or "Dracula's Castle".

Holidays, traditions, and cuisine 

There are 12 non-working public holidays, including the Great Union Day, celebrated on 1 December in commemoration of the 1918 union of Transylvania with Romania. Winter holidays include the Christmas and New Year festivities during which various unique folklore dances and games are common: plugușorul, sorcova, ursul, and capra. The traditional Romanian dress that otherwise has largely fallen out of use during the 20th century, is a popular ceremonial vestment worn on these festivities, especially in rural areas. There are sacrifices of live pigs during Christmas and lambs during Easter that has required a special exemption from EU law after 2007. In the Easter, traditions such as painting the eggs are very common. On 1 March mărțișor gifting is featured, which is a tradition whereby females are gifted with a type of talisman that is given for good luck.

Romanian cuisine has been influenced by Austrian and German cuisine (especially in the historical regions that had been formerly administered by the Habsburg monarchy), but also shares some similarities with other cuisines in the Balkan region such as the Greek, Bulgarian, or Serbian cuisine. Ciorbă includes a wide range of sour soups, while mititei, mămăligă (similar to polenta), and sarmale are featured commonly in main courses.

Pork, chicken, and beef are the preferred types of meat, but lamb and fish are also quite popular. Certain traditional recipes are made in direct connection with the holidays: chiftele, tobă and tochitură at Christmas; drob, pască and cozonac at Easter and other Romanian holidays. Țuică is a strong plum brandy reaching a 70% alcohol content which is the country's traditional alcoholic beverage, taking as much as 75% of the national crop (Romania is one of the largest plum producers in the world). Traditional alcoholic beverages also include wine, rachiu, palincă and vișinată, but beer consumption has increased dramatically over recent years.

Sports 

Football is the most popular sport in Romania with over 219,000 registered players . The market for professional football in Romania is roughly €740 million according to UEFA.

The governing body is the Romanian Football Federation, which belongs to UEFA. The Romania national football team played its first match in 1922 and is one of only four national teams to have taken part in the first three FIFA World Cups, the other three being Brazil, France, and Belgium. Overall, it has played in seven World Cups and had its most successful period during the 1990s, when it finished 6th at the 1994 FIFA World Cup, eventually being ranked 3rd by FIFA in 1997.

The core player of this golden generation was Gheorghe Hagi, who was nicknamed "Maradona of the Carpathians". Other successful players include the European Golden Shoe winners: Dudu Georgescu, Dorin Mateuț and Rodion Cămătaru, Nicolae Dobrin, Ilie Balaci, Florea Dumitrache, Mihai Mocanu, Michael Klein, Mircea Rednic, Cornel Dinu, Mircea Lucescu, Costică Ștefănescu, Liță Dumitru, Lajos Sătmăreanu, Ștefan Sameș, Ladislau Bölöni, Anghel Iordănescu, Miodrag Belodedici, Helmuth Duckadam, Marius Lăcătuș, Victor Pițurcă and many others, and most recently Gheorghe Popescu, Florin Răducioiu, Dorinel Munteanu, Dan Petrescu, Adrian Mutu, Cristian Chivu, or Cosmin Contra. Romania's home ground is the Arena Națională in Bucharest.

The most successful club is Steaua București, who were the first Eastern European team to win the UEFA Champions League in 1986, and were runners-up in 1989. They were also UEFA Cup semi-finalists in 2006. Dinamo București reached the UEFA Champions League semi-final in 1984 and the UEFA Cup Winners' Cup semi-final in 1990. Other important Romanian football clubs are Rapid București, UTA Arad, Universitatea Craiova, Petrolul Ploiești, CFR Cluj, Astra Giurgiu, and Viitorul Constanța (the latter having recently merged with FCV Farul Constanța).

Tennis is the second most popular sport. Romania reached the Davis Cup finals three times in 1969, 1971 and 1972. In singles, Ilie Năstase was the first year-end World Number 1 in the ATP rankings in 1973, winning several Grand Slam titles. Also Virginia Ruzici won the French Open in 1978, and was runner-up in 1980, Simona Halep won the French Open in 2018 and Wimbledon in 2019 after losing her first three Grand Slam finals. She has ended 2017 and 2018 as WTA's World Number 1. And in doubles Horia Tecău won three Grand Slams and the ATP Finals final. He was World Number 2 in 2015.

The second most popular team sport is handball. The men's team won the handball world championship in 1961, 1964, 1970, 1974 making them the third most successful nation ever in the tournament. The women's team won the world championship in 1962 and have enjoyed more success than their male counterparts in recent years. In the club competition Romanian teams have won the EHF Champions League a total of three times, Steaua București won in 1968 as well as 1977 and Dinamo București won in 1965. The most notable players include Ștefan Birtalan, Vasile Stîngă (all-time top scorer in the national team) and Gheorghe Gruia who was named the best player ever in 1992. In present-day Cristina Neagu is the most notable player and has a record four IHF World Player of the Year awards. In women's handball, powerhouse CSM București lifted the EHF Champions League trophy in 2016.

Popular individual sports include combat sports, martial arts, and swimming. In professional boxing, Romania has produced many world champions across the weight divisions internationally recognised by governing bodies. World champions include Lucian Bute, Leonard Dorin Doroftei, Adrian Diaconu, and Michael Loewe. Another popular combat sport is professional kickboxing, which has produced prominent practitioners including Daniel Ghiță, and Benjamin Adegbuyi.

Romania's 306 all-time Summer Olympics medals would rank 12th most among all countries, while its 89 gold medals would be 14th most. The 1984 Summer Olympics was their most successful run, where they won 53 medals in total, 20 of them gold, ultimately placing 2nd to the hosts United States in the medal rankings. Amongst countries who have never hosted the event themselves, they are second in the total number of medals earned.

Gymnastics is the country's major medal-producing sport, with Olympic and sport icon Nadia Comăneci becoming the first gymnast ever to score a perfect ten in an Olympic event at the 1976 Summer Olympics. Other Romanian athletes who collected five gold medals like Comăneci are rowers Elisabeta Lipa (1984–2004) and Georgeta Damian (2000–2008). The Romanian competitors have won gold medals in other Olympic sports: athletics, canoeing, wrestling, shooting, fencing, swimming, weightlifting, boxing, and judo.

See also

 Outline of Romania
100 Greatest Romanians

Notes

References

Sources

Secondary sources

 
 
 
 
  excerpt
 Hitchins, Keith. Rumania 1866-1947 (1994) (Oxford History of Modern Europe) excerpt
 
 
 
 
 
 
 
 Stavrianos, L.S.  The Balkans Since 1453 (1958), major scholarly history; online free to borrow

Primary sources

  The Ancient History of Herodotus (Translated by William Beloe) (1859). Derby & Jackson.
 Eutropius, Abridgment of Roman History (Translated by John Selby Watson) (1886). George Bell and Sons.

External links

 Country Profile from BBC News.
 Romania Article and Country Profile from Encyclopædia Britannica
 Romania Profile from Balkan Insight.
 România Un Secol de Istorie – statistical data from INS
 Romania. The World Factbook. Central Intelligence Agency.

Government
 Romanian Presidency
 Romanian Parliament

Culture and history links
 Treasures of the national library of Romania
 Historic Houses of Romania

 
1859 establishments in Europe
Balkan countries
Countries in Europe
Member states of the United Nations
Eastern European countries
Member states of NATO
Member states of the European Union
Member states of the Union for the Mediterranean
Member states of the Three Seas Initiative
Republics
Romanian-speaking countries and territories
Southeastern European countries
States and territories established in 1859